The Yumyum Tree is the twelfth studio album by the English band Ozric Tentacles, released on 27 April 2009. It is inspired by Lewis Carroll's poem Jabberwocky.

Track listing

Credits
All tracks written by Ed Wynne.
Recorded 2006-2008 in Somerset, England
Tracks 3, 5 & 8 recorded at Mooncalf Studios, Wiltshire, England
Mastered by Jas Mitchell at Loud Mastering
Cover art by Boswell
Ed Wynne - guitars, synths, programming…
Brandi Wynne – keyboards, “airy areas” [effects]
Vinny Shillito - bass guitar
Roy Brosh - drums
Dominic Gibbins - darbuka (on Plant Music)
Special thanks to:
Joie Hinton & Mervyn Pepler for their help on tracks 4 & 8

References

2009 albums
Ozric Tentacles albums